HMS E52 was a British E class submarine ordered from Yarrow Shipbuilders, Scotstoun but was transferred on 3 March 1915 to William Denny and Brothers, Dumbarton. She was launched on 25 January 1917. E52 sank the U-boat  near the Goodwin Sands, Dover Straits on 1 November 1917. E52 was sold on 3 January 1921 at Brixham.

Design
She was powered by two  Vickers eight-cylinder two-stroke diesel engines and two  electric motors.

E52 was armed with a 12-pounder  QF gun mounted forward of the conning tower. She had five 18 inch (450 mm) torpedo tubes, two in the bow, one either side amidships, and one in the stern; a total of 10 torpedoes were carried.

E-Class submarines had wireless systems with  power ratings; in some submarines, these were later upgraded to  systems by removing a midship torpedo tube. Their maximum design depth was  although in service some reached depths of below . Some submarines contained Fessenden oscillator systems.

References

Bibliography
 

 

British E-class submarines of the Royal Navy
Ships built on the River Clyde
1917 ships
World War I submarines of the United Kingdom
Royal Navy ship names